Vera Yakovlevna Komisova, née Nikitina (born 11 June 1953) is a retired hurdler. Her career highlight came in 1980 when she won the Olympic gold medal.

External links 
Sporting Heroes
sports-reference

1953 births
Living people
Athletes from Saint Petersburg
Athletes (track and field) at the 1980 Summer Olympics
Medalists at the 1979 Summer Universiade
Medalists at the 1980 Summer Olympics
Olympic athletes of the Soviet Union
Olympic gold medalists for the Soviet Union
Olympic gold medalists in athletics (track and field)
Olympic silver medalists for the Soviet Union
Olympic silver medalists in athletics (track and field)
Universiade bronze medalists for the Soviet Union
Universiade medalists in athletics (track and field)
Honoured Masters of Sport of the USSR
Recipients of the Order of the Red Banner of Labour
Russian female hurdlers
Russian female sprinters
Soviet female hurdlers

Soviet female sprinters